Sir Arthur Stewart Leslie Young, 1st Baronet (10 October 1889 – 14 August 1950) was a Scottish Unionist Party politician.

He sat as the member of parliament (MP) for Glasgow Partick (UK Parliament constituency) from 1935 to 1950, and then sat for Glasgow Scotstoun (UK Parliament constituency) until his death.

He held junior ministerial posts in the Coalition Government 1940-1945 and the Caretaker Government 1945. He was created a baronet on 7 September 1945.

Arms

References

External links 

1889 births
1950 deaths
Baronets in the Baronetage of the United Kingdom
Members of the Parliament of the United Kingdom for Glasgow constituencies
Ministers in the Churchill wartime government, 1940–1945
Partick
UK MPs 1935–1945
UK MPs 1945–1950
UK MPs 1950–1951
Unionist Party (Scotland) MPs
Ministers in the Churchill caretaker government, 1945